In an automobile, the wheel spindle, sometimes called simply the spindle, is the part of the suspension system that carries the hub for the wheel and attaches to the upper and lower control arms.

Spindles are carried by steering knuckles or "uprights". Although the terms "steering knuckle" and "upright" are sometimes used interchangeably with "spindle", they all refer to different parts.

Design
There are several considerations when designing a spindle. Loads and forces need to be considered. Tolerance to vertical and horizontal forces greater than those due to 5 times the acceleration of gravity, approximately 50 meters per second squared, are sometimes considered desirable.

Non-driven wheel
The main forces on a non-driven wheel are braking and turning forces.

Driven wheel
The main forces on a driven wheel include forward and reverse propulsion in addition to braking and turning forces.

See also 
 Front axle assembly
 Pintle

References 

 List of Spindles/Uprights available in Australia suitable for Race, Modified and Individuality Constructed Vehicles

Automotive suspension technologies